Thycattusserry is a village in the Cherthala taluk of the Alappuzha district in the Indian state of Kerala.

Demographics
 India census, Thycattusserry had a population of 20,052 with 9,915 males and 10,137 females. Thycattusserry is situated in Pallippuram Islands, 35 km north of Alappuzha and 30 km south of Kochi. The major income source of this place is fishing and coir industry. Thycattusserry is geographically surrounded by Vembanad lake and its tributaries.

Thycattusserry is famous for 'Panchara Manal' [Silica sand], the major raw material used in glass and cement industry.

Educational institutions

The major educational Institutions in Thycattusserry are SMSJHS Thycattusserry, Govt.HS Thevarvattom, St. Theresas HS Manappuram, MDUPS Maniyathrikkal, St.Marys LPS Srambikkal, and Govt.UPS Thycattusserry.

Industry

The main industry here is based on the products from the humble coconut tree. The coconut oil is used for cooking, as hair oil and in manufacture of soap. The coir extracted from the husk of the coconut tree is used for making rope, door mats, carpets and as protection against soil erosion.

Fishing and allied industries is another major source of livelihood. The place is endowed with a network of canals which are invariably connected with either the Arabian sea on the west or the Vembanad back waters on the east side. Of late prawn farming has caught up with the place. The prawn mainly go into the export market.

Poochakkal is a big town and economical capital of Thycattusserry situated in Cherthala-Arookutty Bus route.

Temples
  Thycattusserry Punnakkeezhil Sreekurumba & Kothesivapuram Temple [One of the famous temples in Alappuzha District]
  Thaikkathrikkayil Temple
  Nadubhagom Maniya Thrikkayil Temple
  Subrahmanyapuram Temple Thycattusserry
  Nadubhagom Sivasubrahmanyapuram Temple [Ardhanareeswara Temple]
  Nagari Sree Dharmasastha Temple
  Gowrinatha Temple Makkekadavu
  Elikkattu Sreedharmasastha Temple
  Thycattuserry Bhagavathy "MOOLASTHANAM" at Eloor KALARY Thevarvattom
  Ulavaipu Mahadeva Temple
  Aduvayil Mahadeva Temple
 Attupuram Sree Gandharva Swamy Temple

Masjid
  Thevarvattom Masjid,

Churches
  St.Antonys Church
  St.Marys Church Srambikkal
  Valliara Church
  Little flower Church, Manappuram
 St.Martin Deporous Church Ulavaipu
Baptism Church
 Church at Thycattussery ( Thycattussery Sabha )

Railway
 The nearest Railway station is Thuravoor [2.5 km from village Headquarters]
 Cherthala [Shertallai] 14 km away from village Headquarters.

Waterway
Thycattusserry lies between the Kottapuram-Kollam National Inland Waterway passing through the Vembanad lake. Prior to the coming of NH-47 the cargo and freight from Cochin market was transported in country boats through the Vembanad lake via the small lake diverting from Arukutty-Kudapuram-Ulavaipu[Kaithappuzha Lake]. Now these country boats are no more used for cargo transportation, instead converted into tourist floating house boats. We can reach Vaikom by the Tavankadav-Vaikom ferry service covering approx 3.5 km across the Vembanad lake and joining the Kottayam district at Vaikom jetty and also Jangar Servises to reach Thuravoor from Thycattusserry and Nerekadavu[Vaikom] from Makkekadavu.

Local places in Thycattusserry
 P.S.Kavala
 Poochakkal
 Maniyathikkal
 Srambickal
 Makkekadavu
 Thevarvattom
 Nagari
 Cheerathukad 
 Santhikkavala, is the south border junction of  Thycattusserry.
 Paniyath
 Thandappally
 Ulavaipu [Ambedkar Gramam]
 Polekkadavu
 Manakkal Bhagom
 Chudukattum Puram
Nrekadev

References

Villages in Alappuzha district